The Indian State of Karnataka is located between 11°30' North and 18°30' North latitudes and between 74° East and 78°30' East longitude.It is situated on a tableland where the Western Ghats and Eastern Ghats converge into the complex, in the western part of the Deccan Peninsular region of India. The State is bounded by Maharashtra and Goa States in the north and northwest; by the Lakshadweep Sea in the west; by Kerala in the south-west and Tamil Nadu in the south and south-east, Andhra Pradesh in the south-east and east and Telangana in the north-east.

Karnataka is situated in the Deccan Plateau and is bordered by the Arabian Sea to the west, Goa to the northwest, Maharashtra to the north, Andhra Pradesh to the southeast and east, Telangana to the east, Tamil Nadu to the south and southeast, and Kerala to the southwest. It is situated at the angle where the Western Ghats and Eastern Ghats of South India converge into the Nilgiri hills.

Physiography
The state is divisible in to three distinct geomorphic zones:
 The coastal plains, called the Karavali area lies between the Western Ghats and the Arabian Sea. The Karavali are lowlands, with moderate to high rainfall levels.
The plateau is relatively  dry and verging on the semi-arid. The plateau is scattered with narrow ridges, and hills of schistose rock and granitic boulders.

The highest recorded temperature was 45.6 °C (114.08 °F) at Raichuru on 23 May 1928. The lowest recorded temperature was 2.8 °C (37.04 °F) at Bidar on 16 December 1918.

Area and population
Karnataka has a total land area of 191,791 km² and accounts for 5.83% of the total area of the country (measured at 3,288,000 km²).  This puts it in seventh place in terms of size.  With a population of 6,11,30,704, it occupies eighth place in terms of population.  The population density which stands at 319 persons per km² is lower than the all-India average of 382.

Mineral resource
Karnataka is rich in mineral wealth which is distributed fairly evenly across the state.  Karnataka's Geological Survey department started in 1880 is one of the oldest in the country.  Rich deposits of asbestos, bauxite, chromite, dolomite, gold, iron ore, kaolin, limestone, magnesite, Manganese, ochre, quartz, and silica sand are found in the state.  Karnataka is also a major producer of felsite, molding sand (63%), and fuchsite quartzite (57%) in the country.

Karnataka has two major centers of gold mining in the state Kolar and Raichur.  These mines produce about 3000  kg of gold per annum which accounts for almost 84% of the country's production.  Karnataka has very rich deposits of high-grade iron and manganese ores to the tune of 1,000 million tonnes.  Most of the iron ores are concentrated around the Ballari-Hosapete region.  Karnataka with a granite rock spread of over 4200  km² is also famous for its Ornamental Granites with different hues.

Geology 
According to Radhakrishnan and Vaidyanadhan (1997), there are four main types of geological formations in Karnataka:
 The Archean complex made up of Dharwad schists and granitic gneisses: These cover around 60% of the area of the state and consist of gneisses, granites and charnockite rocks. Some of the minerals found in this region are dolomite, limestone, gabbro, quartzite, pyroxenite, manganese and iron ores and metabasalt.
The Bhima series that is present on either side of the Bhima River consists of rocks containing sandstone, limestone and shale and this is present in the Kalaburagi and Vijayapura districts.
 The Deccan trappean and intertrappean deposits: This is a part of the Deccan traps which were formed by the accumulation of basaltic lava. This is made up of greyish to black augite-basalt.
 The tertiary and recent laterites and alluvial deposits: Laterite capping are found over the Deccan Traps and were formed after the cessation of volcanic activity in the early tertiary period. These are found in many districts in the Deccan plateau and also in the coast.

Soil types
Eleven groups of soil orders are found in Karnataka. Entisols, Inceptisols, Mollisols, Spodosols, Alfisols, Ultisols, Oxisols, Aridisols, Vertisols, Andisols and Histosols. Depending on the agricultural capability of the soil, the soil types are divided into six types., Red, lateritic (lateritic soil is found in bidar and kolar district), black, alluvio-colluvial, forest and coastal soils.
The common types of soil groups found in Karnataka are:
 Red soils: Red gravelly loam soil, Red loam soil, Red gravelly clay soil, Red clay soil
 Black soil: gravelly soil, loose, black soil , basalt deposits
 Lateritic soils: Lateritic gravelly soil, Lateritic soil
 Black soils: Deep black soil, Medium deep black soil, Shallow black soil
 Alluvio-Colluvial Soils: Non-saline, saline and sodic
 Forest soil: Brown forest soil
 Coastal soil: Coastal laterite soil, Coastal alluvial soil

Water Resources

Around 60% of this is provided by the west flowing rivers while the remaining comes from the east flowing rivers. There are seven river basins in all formed by the Godavari, Kaveri, Krishna, the west-flowing rivers, Penna, Ponniyar, and Palar.

Waterfalls in Karnataka
 Kalhatti Falls
 Anashi Falls
 Chakra River
 Vibhooti Falls
 Onake Abbi Falls
 Hanumangundi Falls
 Chelavara Falls
 Kadra Falls
 Gootlu Falls
 Hidlumane Falls
 Godchinamalaki Falls
 Abbey Falls
 Bandaje Falls
 Barkana Falls
 Chunchanakatte Falls
 Devaragundi Falls
 Gokak Falls
 Hebbe Falls
 Irupu Falls
 Jaladurga Falls
 Jog Falls
 Kalhatti Falls
 Kunchikal Falls
 Magod Falls
 Mallalli Falls
 Muthyalamaduvu Falls
 Sathodi Falls
 Shivanasamudra Falls
 Shivagange Falls
 Sirimane Falls
 Vajrapoha Falls
 Varapoha Falls
 Unchalli Falls

East flowing rivers
30 East-flowing rivers.
 Amarja
 Arkavathy River
 Agrani River
 Bhadra River
 Chakra River
 Dandavathi
 Doni River
 Ghataprabha River
 Hemavati River
 Hiranyakeshi River
 Honnuhole River
 Kabini River
 Kaveri River
 Kagina River
 Kedaka River
 Krishna River
 Kubja River
 Lakshmana Tirtha River
 Malaprabha River
 Palar River
 Panchagangavalli River
 Penner River
 Ponnaiyar River
 Shimsha
 South Pennar River
 Tunga River
 Tungabhadra River
 Varada
 Vedavathi River
 Vrishabhavathi River

West flowing rivers
12 West-flowing rivers, providing 60% of state's inland water resources.
 Gangavalli River
 Aghanashini River
 Kali River
 Kumaradhara River
 Mahadayi River
 Shambhavi River
 Varahi River
 Souparnika River
 Sharavathi River
 Netravati River
 Gurupura River
 Seetha  river

Reservoirs 
Lal Bahadur Shastri Sagara, Alamatti.
Basava Sagar Reservoir.
Navilu theertha Reservoir.
Ghataprabha Reservoir.
Dhupdal Reservoir.
Tungabhadra dam, Hosapete.
Linganamakki.
Bhadra Dam.
Krishna Raja Sagara.
Tippagondanahalli Reservoir.
Harangi dam.
Hemavathi Reservoir.
Karanja Reservoir, Bidar.
Kabini Reservoir(Kapila Jalashaya) H.D kote

Lakes 
Lakes in Bengaluru
Mysuru City lakes
Shanthi Sagara, Davanagere
Unkal lake, Hubballi
Belagavi Fort Lake
Heggeri Lake, Haveri
 Hagari Jalashaya , Malavi
 Sharanabasava Lake , Kalaburagi

Climate
Karnataka has the following four seasons in the year:
 The winter season from January to February
 The summer season from March to May
 The monsoon season from June to September
 The post-monsoon season from October to December.

The post-monsoon (period of retreating) and winter seasons are generally pleasant over the entire state. The months April and May are hot, very dry and generally uncomfortable. Weather tends to be oppressive during June due to high humidity and temperature. The next three months (July, August and September) are somewhat comfortable due to reduced day temperature although the humidity continue to be very high. The lowest recorded temperature was  C at Bidar on 16 December 1918.

Karnataka is divided into three meteorological zones:
 Coastal Karnataka: This zone comprises the districts of Uttara Kannada, Udupi and Dakshina Kannada.
 North Interior Karnataka: This zone comprises the districts of Belagavi, Bidar, Vijayapura, Bagalkote, Haveri, Gadaga, Dharwad, Kalaburagi, Koppala, Ballari, Raichuru, Yadagiri and Vijayanagara. This is an arid zone and receives only  of average rainfall per annum.
 South Interior Karnataka: The rest of the districts of Bengaluru Urban, Bengaluru Rural, Ramanagara, Kolar, Chikkaballapura, Mandya, Mysuru, Chamarajanagara, Kodagu, Tumakuru, Hassana, Chitradurga, Davanagere, Chikkamagaluru and Shivamogga. This zone receives  of average rainfall per annum.

Rainfall

The southwest monsoon accounts for almost 80% of the rainfall that the state receives.  The annual rainfall across the state ranges from low  to copious .  The districts of Vijapura, Raichuru, Ballari, Yadagiri and Southern half of Kalaburagi experience the lowest rainfall ranging from 50 to  while the west coastal region and Malenadu enjoy the highest rainfall.

The following were the top 5 places that peaked in rainfall statistics [2010-2017]

Forests
About 38724 km² (or 20% of Karnataka's geographic) are covered by forests. The forests are classified as reserved (28,611 km²) protected (3,932 km²), unclosed (5,748 km²), village (124 km²) and private (309 km²) forests. The percentage of forests area to Geographical area in the State is less than the all-India average of about 23%, and 33% prescribed in the National Forest Policy. The area under protected forests in the neighboring States is as follows: Andhra Pradesh 62,000 km² (9% of the total area of the country), Maharashtra 54,000 km² (8%), Tamil Nadu 22,000 km² (3%) and Kerala 11,000 km² (2%).

Karnataka is known for its valuable timbers from the evergreen forests in the Western Ghat region, notably Teak and Rosewood, the richly ornate panels of which adorn the beautiful chambers of the Two Houses of Karnataka Legislature.

References

Further reading
 Ground Water Quality in Rural Areas: A Case Study of Karnataka. Dr. Oinam Jayalakshmi Devi & Dr. S.L. Belagali. Ruby Press & Co . New Delhi. (2013).